Ringwood Brewery is a small brewery on the edge of the New Forest in Hampshire, England, near the Dorset border. It produces mainly cask ales and some bottled beers.

The emblem for the brewery is a boar.

There are records from the early 19th century of four breweries, one owned by a banker named Stephen Tunks, that stood on the site of the present day Ringwood Brewery. Of the four, none survive today. The last to close was Carters on West Street, in 1923.

In 1978, Ringwood Brewery was established.

Ringwood Brewery founder Peter Austin was an influence on Britain's craft brewery rebirth in much the same way that Fritz Maytag of San Francisco's Anchor Brewing Company and Pierre Celis of Belgium's Hoegaarden Brewery were to their countries. However, Austin had a much more direct role in brewery development through his consulting business and equipment sales. Several American craft brewers use his equipment: Geary's Brewing, Shipyard and Middle Ages Brewing Company.

In 2007, Ringwood was purchased by Marston's plc for £19.2 million. Marston's stated that they would keep the brewery in operation and continue producing the full range of Ringwood beers.

In 2013, Ringwood underwent a full re-brand, and the ABV of Old Thumper was reduced from 5.6% to 5.1%.

In 2015, Ringwood Best Bitter was rebranded as Ringwood Razorback.

Beers

Permanent ales

 Razorback (previously Best Bitter) – 3.6%. - Bitter
 Boondoggle – 4.2%  - Blonde Beer
 Forty Niner – 4.9%. - golden ale
 Old Thumper – 5.1%. - Strong ale, used to be as strong as 6%, then 5.8%, now 5.1%

Seasonal ales

 Scuttle Butt - 4.0%. Amber ale 
 Young Scrumper - 4.0%. Blonde ale
 Filly Drift - 4.7%. Bitter
 Showman's Tipple - 3.8%. Bitter
 True Glory - 4.5%. Amber ale 
 XXXX Porter - 4.7%. - Porter
 Shy Giant - 4.5% - NE IPA

Commemorative ales

 Seventy Eight Spring Ale 4.2% alcohol by volume, special brew produced in 2008 to commemorate the thirtieth anniversary of the brewery.

References

External links
 Ringwood Brewery website

Breweries in England
Companies based in Hampshire
Ringwood, Hampshire